Nina Nikolayevna Berberova (St Petersburg, 26 July 1901 – Philadelphia, 26 September 1993) was a Russian writer who chronicled the lives of anti-communist Russian refugees in Paris in her short stories and novels. She visited post-Soviet Russia. Her 1965-revision of the Constance Garnett translation of Leo Tolstoy's Anna Karenina with Leonard J. Kent is considered the best translation so far by the academic Zoja Pavlovskis-Petit.

Life
Born in 1901 to an Armenian father and a Russian mother, Nina Berberova was brought up in Saint Petersburg. She emigrated from Soviet Russia to the Weimar Republic in 1922 with the poet Vladislav Khodasevich (who died in 1939). The couple lived in Berlin until 1924 and then settled in Paris. There, Berberova became a permanent contributor to the White émigré publication Posledniye Novosti ("The Latest News"), where she published short stories, poems, film reviews and chronicles of Soviet literature. She also wrote for many other Russian émigré publications based in Paris, Berlin and Prague. The stories collected in Oblegchenie Uchasti ("The Easing of Fate") and Biiankurskie Prazdniki ("Billancourt Fiestas") were written during this period. She also wrote the first book-length biography of composer Pyotr Ilyich Tchaikovsky in 1936, which was deeply controversial at the time for its openness about the composer's homosexuality. In Paris, she was part of a circle of poor but distinguished literary Russian refugees that included Vladimir Nabokov, Boris Pasternak, Marina Tsvetaeva and Vladimir Mayakovsky. From its inception in 1940, she became a permanent contributor to the weekly Russkaia Mysl’ ("Russian Thought").

After living in Paris for 25 years, Berberova emigrated to the United States in 1950 and became an American citizen in 1959. In 1954, she married George Kochevitsky, Russian pianist and teacher. She began her academic career in 1958 when she was hired to teach Russian at Yale. She continued to write while she was teaching and published several povesti (long short stories), literary criticism and some poetry. She left Yale in 1963 for Princeton, where she taught until her retirement in 1971. Berberova moved from Princeton, New Jersey, to Philadelphia in 1991.

Berberova's autobiography, which details her early life and years in France, was written in Russian but published first in English as The Italics are Mine (Harcourt, Brace & World, 1969). The Russian edition, Kursiv Moi, was not published until 1983.

English translations
Anna Karenina, with Leonard J. Kent  Random House 1965, republished by Modern Library 2000
The Italics are Mine, Vintage, 1993.
Aleksandr Blok: A Life, George Braziller, 1996.
Cape of Storms, New Directions 1999.
The Ladies from St. Petersburg, New Directions, 2000.
The Tattered Cloak and Other Stories, Knoff 1991, reprinted New Directions 2001.
The Book of Happiness, New Directions, 2002.
The Accompanist, New Directions, 2003.
Moura: The Dangerous Life of the Baroness Budberg, NYRB Classics, 2005.
Billancourt Tales, New Directions, 2009.

Bibliography
 (1920s) ,  ("Billancourt Holidays", stories published in the 1920s in the Parisian Russian language daily). English translation:  Billancourt Tales, New York : New Directions, 2001.
 (1930) ,  ("Last and First") 
 (1932) ,  ("Mistress")
 (1936) ,  ("Tchaikovsky: The Story of a Lonely Life")
 (1938) ,  ("Without a Sunset")
 (1947)  ("Alexander Blok and his time")
 (1969) The Italics are Mine (English version of)
 (1982) ,  ("Iron Woman")
 (1986) ,

References

Sources
Barker, Murl G. 1994. In Memoriam: Nina Nikolaevna Berberova 1901–1993. The Slavic and East European Journal 38(3):553-556.
Kasack, Wolfgang. 1988. Dictionary of Russian literature since 1917. New York: Columbia University Press.
Buck, Joan Juliet 1993. "Postscript: Nina Berberova." The New Yorker,'' 25 October 1993.

External links 
Boris I. Nicolaevsky Collection at Stanford University, much of Berberova's early literary archive (1922–1950)
Nina Berberova Papers, later literary archive (after 1950)
Nina Berberova Collection Beinecke Rare Book and Manuscript Library, Yale University.
  (in Russian)

1901 births
1993 deaths
Short story writers from the Russian Empire
Novelists from the Russian Empire
Armenian people from the Russian Empire
American writers of Russian descent
French people of Russian descent
Soviet emigrants to France
Russian women novelists
American women short story writers
American short story writers
Yale University people
20th-century American women writers
20th-century novelists
Russian people of Armenian descent
20th-century short story writers